Kishikawa Bosai Dam is a conrete gravity dam located in Saga Prefecture in Japan. The dam is used for flood control. The catchment area of the dam is  km2. The dam impounds about 4  ha of land when full and can store 330 thousand cubic meters of water.

References

Dams in Saga Prefecture
1962 establishments in Japan